Desh Premee is a 1982 Hindi action film directed by Manmohan Desai, starring Amitabh Bachchan in a dual role alongside an ensemble cast including Hema Malini, Navin Nischol, Parveen Babi, Uttam Kumar, Shammi Kapoor, Premnath, Parikshit Sahni, Amjad Khan and Sharmila Tagore. The film has musical score by Lakshmikant-Pyarelal duo. This is one of the last film of the legendary actor Uttam Kumar.

It was the fifth collaboration of Manmohan Desai and Amitabh Bachchan. The film fell short of the standards of the previous Amitabh Bachchan — Manmohan Desai duo's film garnering mixed reviews but ended up as an moderate success grosser at the box office. It celebrated silver jubilee at Venkataramana 70mm A/c (3 shows) in Hyderabad.

The film is dedicated to the memory of Mohammed Rafi, who sang the film's title song and one of its cast members Uttam Kumar, both of whom died two years before the film was released. This was the only film for which music director Laxmikant was also a playback singer for one song. The songs were penned by Anand Bakshi.

Synopsis

Master Dinanath (Amitabh Bachchan) is a freedom fighter and participated in the war against the British in 1942 and independence was eventually won in 1947. But after independence, the people's love for their country seems to be diminishing and they are too busy betraying it like ex British landlord Thakur Pratab Singh (Amjad Khan). Master Dinanath finds out about Thakur Pratab Singh's illegal activities such as smuggling of weapons and ammunition and gets him arrested. In revenge for putting him in prison, Pratab Singh gets Master Dinanath's wife Bharati (Sharmila Tagore) and daughter Priti (Parveen Babi) kidnapped by Thakur's partner in crime Sher Singh (Kader Khan) to try to change his ways but, to no avail. Thakur also provokes an attack on Masterji's home by the local villagers, who accuse Dinanath of betraying his country and he is forced to flee his home with his young son Raju. His wife becomes a victim of leprosy and escapes from Sher Singh, leaving her daughter Priti in a friend's care. Masterji is informed that his wife and daughter could be dead as they find a necklace of hers near the train tracks. Masterji is devastated by his wife and daughter's loss and he and his son move on with their life.

They settle into a slum called Bharat Nagar, which is divided into four sections with a don in each of different backgrounds: Punjabi (Shammi Kapoor), a Tamilian (Premnath). Bengali (Uttam Kumar) and Muslim (Parikshat Sahni). All of them love their own section, but nobody thinks of themselves as Indian except Masterji. Masterji tries to bring peace between the four dons and once they settle their differences, the four underworld dons use the Masterji's stay in Bharat Nagar to cover up their own illegal activities.

15 years later, Masterji's now grown-up son Raju (again played by Amitabh Bachchan) turns out to be the opposite of his father. He starts working for Thakur Pratap Singh, unaware that Thakur had once kidnapped his mother and sister. Will Raju find out what Thakur did to his family? Will Master Dinanath find out his son is not who he thinks he is? and will Master ever find his wife and daughter again?

Cast
 Amitabh Bachchan as Master Dinanath and Raju (dual role)(father and son)
 Hema Malini as Asha, Raju's wife
 Navin Nischol as Inspector Deepak Singh (Thakur Pratap Singh's son)
 Parveen Babi as Dr. Preeti (Master's daughter)
 Uttam Kumar as Ghosh Babu
 Shammi Kapoor as Shamsher Singh
 Sudha Chopra as Shamsher Singh's wife
 Amjad Khan as Thakur Pratap Singh
 Premnath as Puthu Anna
 Parikshat Sahni as Ghulam Ali
 Prem Chopra as Don
 Kader Khan as Sher Singh
 Sharmila Tagore as Bharati (Master's wife)
 Jeevan as Munim
  Yusuf Khan as Thakur Pratap Singh's aide
 Jagdish Raj as Retired Major (Dr.Preeti's guardian father)
 Geeta Siddharth as Dr.Preeti's guardian mother
 Shivraj
 Gurbachan Singh

This is one of the last film of the iconic legendary actor Uttam Kumar who died between filming. Then Actor Sudhir Dalvi has giving a voice over to Uttam Kumar. The song of Mohammad Rafi "Mere Desh Premiyon" was the last song of his in Manmohan Desai's film. Manmohan Desai and Mohammed Rafi, with Laxmikant Pyarelal's music, created a magical era of music in Bollywood movies. Shammi Kapoor acted in a supporting role in the movie and had no song. Two songs of Kishore Kumar and one song of Mohammed Rafi were pictured on Amitabh Bachchan. The song of Kishore Kumar "Khatoon Ki Khidmat Mein" was influenced by Mohammed Rafi's "Hum Kaale To Kya Hua Dilwale Hain" from the film Gumnaam. For this song, Amitabh Bachchan also dressed and acted like Mehmood, on whom that song was picturized. Laxmikant has sung "Gore Nahin Hum Kaale Sahi", a duet with Asha Bhosle, and his voice was used on both Amitabh Bachchan and Prem Chopra for the song. Asha Bhosle has sung for Hema Malini. Navin Nichol was the supporting actor, and also had one song, and Amit Kumar has sung for him, a duet with Kishore Kumar "Jaa Jaldi Bhaag Jaa". The music of the movie was fairly popular.

The movie celebrated a golden jubilee in Hyderabad Ramakrishna 70MM theatres, and was hugely successful on re-release in the 1980s and 1990s.

Soundtrack

References

External links

1980s Hindi-language films
1982 films
Films directed by Manmohan Desai
Films scored by Laxmikant–Pyarelal